A Neighborhood Electric Vehicle (NEV) is a U.S. category for battery electric vehicles that are usually built to have a top speed of , and have a maximum loaded weight of . NEVs fall under the United States Department of Transportation classification for low-speed vehicles. The non-electric version of the neighborhood electric vehicle is the motorized quadricycle.

A NEV battery pack recharges by plugging into a standard outlet and because it is an all-electric vehicle it does not produce tailpipe emissions. If recharged from clean energy sources such as solar or wind power, NEVs do not produce greenhouse gas emissions after manufacture. In the state of California NEVs are classified by the California Air Resources Board (CARB) as zero-emissions vehicles (ZEV) and are eligible for a purchase rebate of up to $1,500 if purchased or leased on or after March 15, 2010.

, the GEM neighborhood electric vehicle was the market leader in North America, with global sales of more than 50,000 units since 1998. Another top selling NEV is the Renault Twizy, launched in March 2012, it was the top-selling plug-in electric vehicle in Europe during 2012, and the heavy quadricycle has sold almost 22,000 units through December 2018.

Sales of low-speed small electric cars (LSEVs) experienced considerable growth in China between 2012 and 2015 due to their affordability and flexibility. A total of 200,000 low-speed small electric cars were sold in China in 2013, most of which are powered by lead-acid batteries. In 2015, sales rose to 750,000 units, and to 1.2 million in 2016. , the stock of LSEVs was estimated to be between 3 million and 4 million units. About 1.4 million low-speed electric vehicles were sold in 2018.

U.S. regulations

Low-speed vehicle is a federally approved street-legal vehicle classification which came into existence in 1998 under Federal Motor Vehicle Safety Standard 500 (FMVSS 500). There is nothing in the federal regulations specifically pertaining to the powertrain.

However, if modified to exceed , the vehicle then becomes subject to safety requirements of passenger cars.

To satisfy federal safety requirements for manufacturers, NEVs must be equipped with three-point seat belts or a lap belt, running lights, headlights, brake lights, reflectors, rear view mirrors, and turn signals. Windshield wipers are not required. In many cases, doors may be optional, crash protection from other vehicles is partially met compared to other non-motorized transport such as bicycles because of the use of seat belts.

State regulations
Regulations for operating an NEV vary by state. The federal government allows state and local governments to add additional safety requirements beyond those of Title 49 Part 571.500. For instance, the State of New York requires additional safety equipment to include windshield wipers, window defroster, speedometer, odometer and a back-up light. Generally, they must be titled and registered, and the driver must be licensed. Because airbags are not required the NEV cannot normally travel on highways or freeways. As of February 2012, NEVs are street-legal in 46 states.

In Ohio, NEVs are classified as "low-speed vehicles", as opposed to golf carts, which are "under-speed vehicles".

Community design

Some communities are designed to separate neighborhoods from commercial and other areas, connecting them with relatively high speed thoroughfares on which NEVs cannot go, legally or safely. As a result, these vehicles are most common in communities that provide separate routes for them or generally accommodate slow speed traffic.

Communities designed specifically with NEVs and similarly sized vehicles in mind include:
Avalon, California
Celebration, Florida
Lady Lake, Florida
The Villages, Florida 
Peachtree City, Georgia

Other cities and communities that have adopted NEV-friendly ordinances or have experienced a significant increase of them and street-legal golf cars since 1990 include:
Alameda, California
Put-in-Bay, Ohio
Venice Beach, Los Angeles, California
Lincoln, California 
Palm Desert, California
Sun City, Arizona
Charleston, South Carolina
Myrtle Beach, South Carolina
Coronado, California
Dunedin, Florida

Sales

US and Europe
, there were between 60,000 and 76,000 low-speed battery-powered vehicles in use in the United States, up from about 56,000 in 2004. Pike Research estimated there were 478,771 NEVs on the world roads in 2011. The two largest NEV markets in 2011 were the United States, with 14,737 units sold, and France, with 2,231 units. 

The different variants of the REVAi, available in 26 countries, sold about 4,600 vehicles worldwide by late 2013, with India and the UK as the main markets. , the GEM neighborhood electric vehicle was the market leader in North America, with global sales of more than 50,000 units since 1998. Another top selling NEV is the Renault Twizy heavy quadricycle, launched in March 2012, with global sales of 15,000 units through April 2015. The Twizy was the top-selling plug-in electric vehicle in Europe during 2012. , a total of 18,592 units had been sold in Europe, representing 96.1% of global sales. Global sales since inception totaled 21,874 units through December 2018.

China

Sales of low-speed small electric cars experienced considerable growth in China between 2012 and 2015 due to their affordability and flexibility because they can be driven without a driver license. Most of these small electric cars are popular in small cities, but they are expanding to larger cities. A total of 200,000 low-speed small electric cars were sold in China in 2013, most of which are powered by lead-acid batteries. These electric vehicles not considered by the government as new energy vehicles due to safety and environmental concerns, and consequently, do not enjoy the same purchase benefits as highway legal plug-in electric cars. 

In 2015, sales of low-speed small electric passenger vehicles  in China totaled 750,000 units, and 1.2 million in 2016. , the stock of low-speed small electric car was estimated to be between 3 million and 4 million units. However the sales ratio between LSEVs and passenger NEVs began to decrease beginning in 2015. In 2014, LSEVs sales were 15 times more than normal plug-in passenger cars, but the ratio declined to about four times in 2016, and fell to 2.5 times in 2018, when about 1.1 million normal passenger electric vehicles, compared to 1.4 million low-speed vehicles.

Examples

BugE
Citroën Ami
CT&T
Estrima Birò
Global Electric Motorcars (GEM)
The Kurrent
Ligier EZ-10 EasyMile
Mia electric
Might-E Truck
Miles Automotive Group
MIT Car
Moke America eMoke
Personal Urban Mobility and Accessibility (proposed)
Polaris Ranger EV LSV
Renault Twizy
REVAi
SC Carts
Trikke Trikke Pon-e 48v UPT
Xtreme Green Products
XEV Yoyo
ZAP Xebra Zap Xebra (2006 - 2010)(Models SD & Truck)
ZENN (Feel Good Cars)

See also
 City car
 Government incentives for plug-in electric vehicles
 Medium Speed Vehicle
 
 Solar Golf Cart
 Electric Commercial Vehicles
 Electric platform truck
 Milk float

References

External links

The ZENN (Zero Emissions No Noise) of Driving
S.A.V.E. pushes legislation for 35 mph in Montana
Yahoo! NEVs group
Summary of Montana's Medium-Speed Electric Vehicle (MSEV) legislation
Washington's MSEV legislation

Neighborhood electric vehicles
Battery electric vehicles